Broken Threads is a 1917 British silent drama film directed by Henry Edwards and starring Edwards, Chrissie White and A.V. Bramble.

Cast
 Henry Edwards - Jack Desmond
 Chrissie White - Helen Desmond
 A.V. Bramble - Pierre
 Harry Gilbey - Murray
 Gwynne Herbert - Housekeeper
 W.G. Saunders - Boniface
 Fred Johnson - Helen's Stepfather
 John MacAndrews - Confederate

References

External links

1917 films
1917 drama films
Films directed by Henry Edwards
Films based on short fiction
British silent feature films
British drama films
Hepworth Pictures films
British black-and-white films
1910s English-language films
1910s British films
Silent drama films